Joel Taylor may refer to:

 Joel Taylor (musician) (born 1959), American drummer
 Joel Taylor (motorcycle racer) (born 1994), motorcycle racer from Australia
 Joel Taylor (footballer) (born 1996), English footballer
 Joel Taylor (died 2018), driver and meteorologist on the TV series Storm Chasers